The 1996 Brisbane Broncos season was the ninth in the club's history. They competed in the Australian Rugby League's 1996 Optus Cup premiership and finished the regular season in second place on the ladder, progressing as far as the semi-finals.

Season summary
In 1996 the Broncos once again started solidly, went through a losing streak mid-season but recovered to finish strongly, conforming to the pattern of previous seasons. However again they capitulated, losing to North Sydney and Cronulla to lose their fifth straight finals match. Gorden Tallis, at the time still contracted to the St George, chose to sit out this season rather than play for the Dragons as he had also signed to play for the Broncos in 1996. At the end of the 1996 season, players Kerrod Walters, Alan Cann, Willie Carne and Michael Hancock were asked to leave the club, as they could no longer be guaranteed regular places in the Broncos' first grade team.

Match results

 *Game following a State of Origin match

Ladder

Scorers

Honours

League
Nil

Club
Player of the year: Allan Langer
Rookie of the year: Tonie Carroll
Back of the year: Allan Langer
Forward of the year: Peter Ryan
Club man of the year: Chris Johns / Gorden Tallis

References

Brisbane Broncos seasons
Brisbane Broncos season